César Bianchi (born 10 November, 1977) is a Uruguayan communicator, presenter, journalist, teacher and writer.

In 2007 he was distinguished in the Latin America contest, organized by the United Nations Development Program (UNDP).

Bianchi is graduated in communication from the Catholic University of Uruguay, and later did a master's degree in journalism from the University of Alcalá, Madrid and another master's in Corporate Communication Management at the Istituto "EAE Business School".
He was a professor at the Universidad ORT Uruguay from 2008 to 2016.
He was a journalist for the newspaper El País, and for the television program Santo y Seña de Channel 4.

In 2007 distinguished in the Latin America contest organized by the UNDP. 
In 2010 finalist for the Gabo Foundation Award.

Books 
 2008, Mujeres Bonitas
 2013, A lo Peñarol
 2014, Muertos acá nomás
 2017, Valeria no pudo bailar.
 2019, Cebolla Rodríguez (con Javier Tairovich).
 2020, Sugar Daddy 

References

External links

1977 births
Uruguayan journalists
Uruguayan writers
Uruguayan columnists
People from Rivera Department
Spanish writers
Uruguayan television journalists
Catholic University of Uruguay alumni
University of Alcalá alumni
Writers from Montevideo
Living people